This article includes the discography of the Swedish singer Carola Häggkvist. All references are from swedishcharts.com.

Albums 

All regularly released albums and their chart positions in the Sweden Top 60 (SWE), Norway (NOR), Denmark (DEN) and Finland (FIN).

Singles

Other songs

Notes

DVDs

References

 
 
Discographies of Swedish artists
Pop music discographies